Veleropilina brummeri is a species of monoplacophoran, a superficially limpet-like marine mollusc. It is found on the Mid-Atlantic Ridge.

References

Monoplacophora
Molluscs described in 1993